The 1885–86 season was the third season Stoke took part the FA Cup.

Season review
Stoke fared little better in the 1885–86 FA Cup again failing to go beyond the first qualifying round, losing to nearby Crewe Alexandra in a replay after extra time.

FA Cup

Squad statistics

Staffordshire Senior Cup

References

Stoke City F.C. seasons
Stoke